The Ad Dimaniyat Islands is a protected area in Oman.

The reserve has a rich natural heritage and is replete with several kinds of coral reefs, including some examples that are quite rare. The island is home to a large number of sea turtles that lay their eggs and nest there, as well as a magnet for migratory and indigenous birds.

Fans of camping and diving now pay more for their satisfaction, after the decree of the Ministry of Environmental Protection and Climate Affairs.

Expatriates pay OMR10, while locals pay OMR5.

Before the new rule, everyone paid OMR1 for entering the islands, OMR3 for diving, OMR5 for camping or OMR7 for the whole package. Under the new law, non-Omanis will have to pay OMR3 per day for a visit, OMR6 for diving and OMR10 for diving and overnight camping.

Approval of the Ministry of Environmental Protection and Climate Affairs is required to visit the islands, which was also the case with the previous law. Stay on the island is allowed for a maximum of 5 days, and the number in the group must not exceed 12 people.

Locally, the islands go by the names Kharabah, Huyoot, Al Jabal Al Kabeer (Um As Sakan). The latter is divided into two islands: Um Al Liwahah (Minaret) and Al Jawn, which includes three islands.

See also

List of lighthouses in Oman

References

External links 
 Nature reserves in Oman
 Picture of Ad Dimaniyat Islands

Literature 
 DAIMĀNIYĀT (ديمانيات), in: Gazetteer of the Persian Gulf, Oman and Central Arabia Online, Edited by: Brill. Consulted online on 10 July 2018 <https://dx.doi.org/10.1163/2405-447X_loro_COM_040131>
First published online: 2015 (online scan, online text)

Protected areas of Oman
Islands of Oman
Lighthouses in Oman